In radiometry, radiant exposure or fluence is the radiant energy received by a surface per unit area, or equivalently the irradiance of a surface, integrated over time of irradiation, and spectral exposure is the radiant exposure per unit frequency or wavelength, depending on whether the spectrum is taken as a function of frequency or of wavelength. The SI unit of radiant exposure is the joule per square metre, while that of spectral exposure in frequency is the joule per square metre per hertz and that of spectral exposure in wavelength is the joule per square metre per metre—commonly the joule per square metre per nanometre.

Mathematical definitions

Radiant exposure
Radiant exposure of a surface, denoted He ("e" for "energetic", to avoid confusion with photometric quantities), is defined as

where
∂ is the partial derivative symbol;
Qe is the radiant energy;
A is the area;
T is the duration of irradiation;
Ee is the irradiance.

Spectral exposure
Spectral exposure in frequency of a surface, denoted He,ν, is defined as

where ν is the frequency.

Spectral exposure in wavelength of a surface, denoted He,λ, is defined as

where λ is the wavelength.

SI radiometry units

See also
Exposure (photography)
Radiant energy
Irradiance

References

Physical quantities
Radiometry